Simon John Yeo (born 10 October 1973 in Stockport, England) is an English former professional footballer who played as a forward from 1997 to 2011 and is currently striker-coach at Mossley.

Yeo a former member of the British Army is most well known for his time at Lincoln City, where he spent two spells with the club between 2002 and 2006. Yeo was part of the side managed by Keith Alexander that were defeated in the League Two play-off final several times. Before his spells at Sincil Bank Yeo had played in Northern Ireland for Ards and Coleraine at non-league level for Curzon Ashton, Hyde United and Atherton Collieries. In 2005, he left Lincoln for the first time after he was scouted by newly formed A-League side New Zealand Knights and became one of the clubs marquee signings. His stay was only brief and he had returned to Lincoln only months later. In 2006, he followed Keith Alexander firstly to Peterborough United and later Chester City, Bury and Macclesfield Town. In 2009, he returned to non-league football by joining Conference North side Droylsden before later joining Harrogate Town and New Mills. In 2011, he retired from competitive football but following the sudden death of Alexander who was then manager of Macclesfield, he re-signed for the club. Yeo went back into retirement a few months later.

Since retiring Yeo has continued to keep close links with Lincoln City and has appeared in several charity games. He was also a baggage handler at Manchester Airport.

Army career
After leaving school, Yeo began a two-year YTS as a carpet fitter before, in May 1992, joining the army with the 22nd (Cheshire) Regiment. His army career included tours of Bosnia and Northern Ireland.

Football career
After leaving the army, he supplemented his semi-professional football career with numerous jobs such as working on building sites, making toilet seats and being a postman in his home town of Stockport. Whilst serving out his final army days in Northern Ireland, his football career began in earnest. He joined Ards in September 1997, signing a twelve-month deal and scoring three times in seven league and cup games before his contract was cancelled to allow him to return home to England to join Curzon Ashton in October 1997. However, he quickly returned to Irish football, joining Coleraine the following month. This move proved controversial with the then Ards manager Roy Coyle claiming that Yeo had stitched him up though Yeo argued that that was not the case and, having scored four goals in four games for Curzon Ashton, he was contacted by Coleraine who offered to fly him in from Manchester for their games.

He remained with Coleraine for the remainder of the 1997–98 season, scoring a total of six goals in 22 appearances, before joining the then Northern Premier League Premier Division side Hyde United. In September 1998 he joined Atherton Collieries on loan, scoring twelve goals in seven games before being sidelined by an ankle ligament injury. Recalled to Hyde, he marked his Northern Premier League debut by scoring both goals in the 2–2 draw with Leigh RMI on 4 December 1998. He would go on to score 111 goals in a total of 169 league and cup appearances for them before joining Lincoln City in May 2002.

Yeo enjoyed two spells with Lincoln City separated by a period playing for the New Zealand Knights in the newly formed A-League. Yeo severed his contract with the Knights because of personal issues. He is something of a cult hero in Lincoln because of his vital goals at the end of the 2002–03 season. He came off the bench to score against Torquay United to put the Lincoln into the Division Three playoffs. Yeo again came to Lincoln's rescue in the playoff semi-final first leg against Scunthorpe United. With the scores tied at 3–3 with 20 minutes remaining Yeo again came off the bench to score 2 goals which put Lincoln firmly in the driving seat. Yeo scored again in the away leg to send them to the final at the Millennium Stadium, which they lost.

Yeo then joined Peterborough for the season of 2006–07 Then he joined Chester City for an undisclosed fee in January 2007, making his debut in a 1–0 win at Accrington Stanley. He was a regular in the starting line-up for the remainder of the season but has tended to be on the bench in the 2007–08 season. On 3 January 2008, he moved to Bury in a long-term loan deal. However, he failed to start a game for the Shakers and he was released by Chester at the end of the season.

On 23 May 2008 it was announced that he would be joining up with his former Manager Keith Alexander once again as he signed with Macclesfield Town, and after one season with Macclesfield, on 5 May 2009 Yeo announced his retirement from football. However, it was later revealed that he joined non-league side Droylsden.

In December 2009, Yeo linked up with his one-time Lincoln City teammate Simon Weaver at Harrogate Town, making his debut for the club in the 1–1 FA Trophy 1st Round tie at Gateshead on 12 December 2009. He made a total of eleven appearances for the club, nine in the Football Conference North, scoring a solitary goal in the 2–0 victory at Vauxhall Motors on 16 February 2010 before signing for New Mills in April 2010. He marked his debut for the Millers by scoring once in a 5–0 North West Counties Football League Premier Division away victory over Alsager Town on 3 April 2010.

On 19 January 2011, he came out of retirement to re-join Macclesfield Town. In July 2016 he was appointed striker-coach at Mossley.

References

External links
 Simon Yeo Interview
 I couldn't afford to stay at Knights, says Yeo 

Profile at UpThePosh! The Peterborough United Database
Hyde United Player Statistics: Simon Yeo
Unofficial Simon Yeo Profile at The Forgotten Imp

1973 births
Living people
Footballers from Stockport
Association football forwards
English footballers
English expatriate footballers
Expatriate soccer players in Australia
Expatriate association footballers in New Zealand
Ards F.C. players
Curzon Ashton F.C. players
Coleraine F.C. players
Hyde United F.C. players
Atherton Collieries A.F.C. players
Lincoln City F.C. players
New Zealand Knights FC players
Peterborough United F.C. players
Chester City F.C. players
Bury F.C. players
Macclesfield Town F.C. players
Droylsden F.C. players
Harrogate Town A.F.C. players
A-League Men players
English Football League players
New Mills A.F.C. players
Fivemiletown United F.C. players